The Fiat Marea (Type 185) is a small family car available as a saloon and an estate, produced by the Italian automaker Fiat. Launched in September 1996, the Marea models were essentially different body styles of Fiat's hatchback offerings, the Bravo and Brava. The Marea replaced the earlier Tipo based Fiat Tempra, as well as the larger Croma. 

While the Fiat Stilo Multiwagon was the successor of the wagon version, the Marea Weekend, the Fiat Linea replaced the saloon version in 2007. The car became officially available from 11 September 1996.

Production and markets

The Marea was originally manufactured in Fiat's Cassino and Mirafiori plants in Italy. Later the Marea also superseded the Tempra in Brazilian (Betim) and Turkish (in Bursa, with Tofaş) plants, which make vehicles mostly for local and other developing markets.

In Europe, production and sales of the Marea ceased in August 2002, one year after the Bravo and Brava were replaced with the Fiat Stilo. The Marea Weekend was replaced by the Stilo Multiwagon unveiled in January 2003, while the saloon's successor, the Fiat Linea, was unveiled in 2007.

Nevertheless, the Marea (in both body styles) was still manufactured in Turkey and Brazil for local (and other Latin American) markets. The Brazilian version was facelifted in 2001, when it gained a redesigned rear end with taillights taken from the Lancia Lybra. 

For 2006, the Marea was mildly revised again, gaining a new rear end, and a new grille, similar in style to other current Fiat models. In mid 2007, Brazilian production of the Marea and Marea Weekend ceased.

Engines
The Marea petrol and JTD engines 1.6 L, 1.8 L and 2.0 L petrol and 1.9 L were sourced from the Brava and Bravo, and a 2.0 20v turbo option from the Fiat Coupé was also available. For a short time there was also a 2.4 turbodiesel available, dropped in 2001, which has become sought after. A BiPower 1.6 L dual fuel engine was later added to the range. It can run on either petrol or compressed natural gas.

1.2 L straight-4 16v 1,242 cc 
1.4 L straight-4 12v 1,370 cc 
1.6 L straight-4 16v 1,581 cc 
1.6 L straight-4 16v 1,581 cc 
1.8 L straight-4 16v 1,747 cc 
2.0 L straight-5 20v 1,998 cc 
2.0 L straight-5 20v turbo 1,998 cc 
1.9 turbodiesel straight-4 8v 
1.9 turbodiesel straight-4 8v 
1.9 common rail (JTD) turbodiesel straight-4 8v 
1.9 common rail (JTD) turbodiesel straight-4 8v 
2.4 turbodiesel 2,387 cc straight-5 10v 
2.4 common rail (JTD) turbodiesel 2,387 cc straight-5 10v

Brazil

The Brazilian-built Fiat Marea was available in sedan and estate body styles and arrived at dealerships in June 1998. It was originally launched with two trim levels: the mid-level ELX and the high-level HLX. The Marea Weekend estate was imported from Italy in small numbers until local production commenced in September 1998.  

A  2.0L petrol engine was standard, although a lower output version producing  was launched later the same year for the base-trim SX model. This was done to reduce Brazilian excise taxes on industrial products (IPI) from 30% to 25% for that model. A sporty Turbo trim with a 2.0L petrol engine producing  was also made available. Retail prices went from 27.582 BRL for a base SX model up to 41.748 BRL for a Turbo model. No diesel engines were available for the Brazilian markets, as local legislation prohibits diesel-powered cars.  

In 2000, the 2.0L engine was replaced with a 2.4L  engine for the ELX and HLX trims, and with a 1.8L  engine for the SX trim. 

The following year, the Brazilian-market Marea received a facelift, with a new front grille and new tail lights borrowed from the Lancia Lybra. A four-speed automatic transmission also became available. 

For the 2005 model year, in an attempt to address declining sales, the Marea received a minor facelift and a new entry-level engine option was offered, an Argentine-built 1.6L engine producing , being the only engine that was not manufactured in Italy. 

A total of 54,781 units were built in Brazil until the end of its production in November 2007.

References

External links

See also
 Fiat Bravo and Brava

Marea
Front-wheel-drive vehicles
Compact cars
Sedans
Station wagons
Police vehicles
2000s cars
Cars introduced in 1996
Cars of Turkey
Cars of Brazil